Bursa is a genus of large sea snails, marine gastropod molluscs in the family Bursidae, the frog snails or frog shells.

Recognized species
Species within the genus Bursa include:

 Bursa asperrima Dunker, 1862
 Bursa awatii Ray, 1949  
 Bursa bufonia (Gmelin, 1791)
 Bursa condita  J. F. Gmelin, 1791  
 Bursa corrugata Perry, 1811 - gaudy frogsnail
 Bursa cruentata  Sowerby, 1835 
 Bursa davidboschi  Beu, 1987 
 Bursa fosteri Beu, 1987
 Bursa granifera Röding
 Bursa granularis Röding, 1798 - Cuba frogsnail
 Bursa grayana Dunker, 1862 - elegant frogsnail
 Bursa humilis Beu, 1981 
 Bursa lamarckii  (G. P. Deshayes, 1853) 
 Bursa latitudo Garrard, 1961
 Bursa lucaensis  Parth, 1991 
 Bursa luteostoma  W. H. Pease, 1861 
 Bursa natalensis  Matthews & Coelho, 1970 
 Bursa quirihorai  Beu, 1987 
 Bursa ranelloides (Reeve, 1844)  - fine-sculpted frogsnail
 Bursa rhodostoma (G. B. Sowerby I or II, 1835) - wine-mouth frog shell
 Bursa rhodostoma thomae  d'Orbigny, 1842  - St. Thomas frog shell
 Bursa rosa Perry, 1811 
 Bursa rugosa  Sowerby, 1835 
 Bursa scrobilator Linnaeus, 1758
 Bursa scrobilator coriacea  L. A. Reeve, 1844  
 Bursa tuberosissima  L. A. Reeve, 1844 
 Bursa verrucosa (G. B. Sowerby I or II, 1825)

Species brought into synonymy
 Bursa affinis (Broderip, W.J., 1832): synonym of Bursa granularis (Röding, 1798)
 Bursa alfredensis Turton, 1932: synonym of Bursa granularis (Röding, 1798)
 Bursa angioyorum Parth, 1990: synonym of Bursa lamarckii (Deshayes, 1853)
 Bursa barcellosi Matthews, Rios & Coelho, 1973: synonym of Ranella olearium (Linnaeus, 1758)
 Bursa bergeri C. E. Tapparone-Canefri, 1880 : synonym of Bursa rhodostoma (Sowerby II, 1835)
 Bursa bubo Linnaeus: synonym of Tutufa bubo (Linnaeus, 1758) represented as Tutufa (Tutufa) bubo (Linnaeus, 1758)
 Bursa bubo lissostoma E. A. Smith, 1914: synonym of Tutufa bubo (Linnaeus, 1758) represented as Tutufa (Tutufa) bubo (Linnaeus, 1758)
 Bursa bufonia dunkeri]'  Kira, 1959 : synonym of Bursa bufonia  Kira, 1959 
 Bursa bufo (Bruguiere, 1792): spelling of Bursa bubo in Spry 1961 Bursa caelata  W. J. Broderip, 1833 : synonym of Bursa corrugata (Perry, 1811)
 Bursa calcipicta Dall, 1908: synonym of Bursa rugosa (G.B. Sowerby II, 1835)
 Bursa californica (Hinds, 1843): synonym of Crossata ventricosa (Broderip, 1833)
 Bursa concinna Dunker, 1862: synonym of Gyrineum concinnum (Dunker, 1862)
 Bursa corrugata ponderosa L. A. Reeve, 1844: synonym of Ranella ponderosa Reeve, 1844, in turn, synonym of Bursa corrugata Perry, 1811
 Bursa corrugata pustulosa L. A. Reeve, 1844: synonym of Bursa corrugata Perry, 1811
 Bursa crassa (Dillwyn, 1817): synonym of Marsupina bufo (Bruguière, 1792)
 Bursa crumena (Lamarck, 1816): synonym of Bufonaria crumena (Lamarck, 1816)
 Bursa crumenoides  Valenciennes, 1832  : synonym of Bufo crumena (Lamarck, 1816)
 Bursa cubaniana (d’Orbigny, 1841): synonym of Bursa granularis (Röding, 1798)
 Bursa cumingiana Dunker, 1862: synonym of Bursa granularis (Röding, 1798)
 Bursa dunkeri  Kira, 1962 : synonym of Bursa bufonia (Gmelin, 1791)
 Bursa echinata (Link, 1807): synonym of Bufonaria echinata (Link, 1807)
 Bursa fijiensis  R. B. Watson, 1881  : synonym of Bursina fijiensis (Watson, 1881)
 Bursa finlayi Mcginty, 1962: synonym of Bursa (Bufonariella) ranelloides (Reeve, 1844)
 Bursa fuscocostata Dunker, 1862: synonym of Gyrineum bituberculare (Lamarck, 1816)
 Bursa gibbosa Röding, 1798: synonym of Marsupina bufo (Bruguière, 1792)
 Bursa gnorima Melvill, 1918: synonym of Bursina gnorima (Melvilll, 1918)
 Bursa granifera (Lamarck, 1816): synonym of Bursa granularis (Röding, 1798)
 Bursa kowiensis Turton, 1932: synonym of Bursa granularis (Röding, 1798)
 Bursa lamarkii (Deshayes, 1853): synonym of Bursa lamarckii (Deshayes, 1853)
 Bursa lamellosa Dunker, 1863: synonym of Aspella producta (Pease, 1861)
 Bursa lampas  C. Linnaeus, 1758 : synonym of Tutufa bubo (Linnaeus, 1758) represented as Tutufa (Tutufa) bubo (Linnaeus, 1758) Bursa leo  Shikama, 1964 : synonym of Bursa tuberosissima (Reeve, 1844) Bursa lissostoma  E. A. Smith, 1914 : synonym of Tutufa bufo (Röding, P.F., 1798)
 Bursa livida  L. A. Reeve, 1844 : synonym of Bursa granularis (Röding, 1798)
 Bursa mammata  P. F. Röding, 1798 : synonym of Bursa bufonia (Gmelin, 1791)
 Bursa marginata (Gmelin, 1791): synonym of Aspa marginata (Gmelin, 1791)
 Bursa monitata  P. F. Röding, 1798 : synonym of Bursa bufonia (Gmelin, 1791)
 Bursa muehlhaeusseri  Parth, 1990 : synonym of Bursa lamarckii (Deshayes, 1853)
 Bursa nigrita Mulhauser & Blocher, 1979: synonym of Tutufa nigrita Mühlhäusser & Blöcher, 1979 represented as Tutufa (Tutufella) nigrita Mühlhäusser & Blöcher, 1979
 Bursa nobilis (Reeve, 1844): synonym of Bursina nobilis (Reeve, 1844)
 Bursa pacamoni  Matthews & Coelho, 1971 : synonym of Bursa grayana Dunker, 1862
 Bursa pustulosa  L. A. Reeve, 1844 ; synonym of Bursa corrugata (Perry, 1811)
 Bursa pygmaea  S. Kosuge, 1979 : synonym of Bursa (Bufonariella) ranelloides (Reeve, 1844)
 Bursa rubeta (Linnaeus, 1758): synonym of Tutufa (Tutufella) rubeta (Linnaeus, 1758)
 Bursa (Tutufa) rubeta var. gigantea Smith, 1914: synonym of Tutufa (Tutufa) bardeyi (Jousseaume, 1881)
 Bursa scrobiculator (Linnaeus, 1758): synonym of Bursa scrobilator (Linnaeus, 1758)
 Bursa semigranosa  J. B. Lamarck, 1822 : synonym of Bursa granularis (Röding, P.F., 1798)
 Bursa spinosa  J. B. Lamarck, 1816 : synonym of Bufonaria echinata Bursa suensonii Mörch, 1853: synonym of Bufonaria echinata (Link, 1807)
 Bursa tenuisculpta (Dautzenberg and Fischer, 1906): synonym of Bursa ranelloides tenuisculpta Dautzenberg & Fischer, 1906 
 Bursa thomae (d'Orbigny, 1842): synonym of Bursa rhodostoma (G. B. Sowerby I or II, 1835)
  Bursa tumida Dunker, 1862: synonym of Argobuccinum tumidum (Dunker, 1862)
  Bursa venustula (Reeve, 1844): synonym of Bursa rhodostoma (Sowerby II, 1835)

References

 Gofas, S.; Le Renard, J.; Bouchet, P. (2001). Mollusca, in: Costello, M.J. et al. (Ed.) (2001). European register of marine species: a check-list of the marine species in Europe and a bibliography of guides to their identification. Collection Patrimoines Naturels, 50: pp. 180-213
 Rolán E., 2005. Malacological Fauna From The Cape Verde Archipelago. Part 1, Polyplacophora and Gastropoda.''

External links 

Bursidae